Aziz Abdukhakimov (born 17, June, 1974) is an Uzbek Deputy Prime Minister of the Republic of Uzbekistan, Minister of Tourism and Cultural Heritage.

Biography 
Aziz Abdukaharovich Abdukhakimov was born on June 17, 1974, in the city of Tashkent. Graduated from Tashkent State Economic University. An economist by profession, he graduated from the Japanese University of Hitotsubashi with a master's degree.

Career 

 1993-1996 - held various positions in the Silk Road Bank.
 1996-2004 - Chief Specialist of the Central Bank of the Republic of Uzbekistan, Head of the Tashkent Office of Berliner Bank AG, Head of the Board of Uzpromstroybank.
 2004-2008 - Head of the Department of Finance, Economy and Foreign Economic Relations of the Cabinet of Ministers of the Republic of Uzbekistan.
 2008-2012 - Chairman of the State Committee for State Property Management of the Republic of Uzbekistan.
 2012-2014 - Chairman of the State Antimonopoly Committee of the Republic of Uzbekistan
 2017-2018 - Chairman of the State Committee for Tourism Development of the Republic of Uzbekistan
 2018-2021 - Deputy Prime Minister of the Republic of Uzbekistan - Head of Education, Health and Social Affairs.
 2020-2021 - Chairman of the State Committee for Tourism Development of the Republic of Uzbekistan
 From 2021, Deputy Prime Minister of the Republic of Uzbekistan - Minister of Tourism and Sports.

References

External links 
 Aziz Abduhakimov Facebook
 Aziz Abduhakimov Instagram

1974 births
Living people
Politicians from Tashkent
Government ministers of Uzbekistan
Hitotsubashi University alumni
Tourism ministers
Sports ministers